Golden Empire is a 1985 compilation album of unreleased songs and remixed versions of songs previously released by Ike & Tina Turner. In 1986, it was reissued on CD with 10 additional tracks. All tracks were produced, engineered, and arranged by Ike Turner; remastered and remixed by Striped Horse Records chief Carlo Nasi and Philadelphia International veteran engineer Don Murray. Between 1985 and 2005, a total of four singles were released from the album.

Content 
The album contains R&B standards such as "I Know (You Don’t Want Me No More)" and "Shake a Hand." There are also contemporary songs — Stevie Wonder's "Living For The City" which the Ike and Tina previously covered for their album Sweet Rhode Island Red, and Ike Turner originals.

In 1985, the two singles were released by Striped Horse, "Living For The City" and "Golden Empire." The following year when the album was reissued, "Shake A Hand" was released as a single. Twenty years after the album was originally released, the track "Raise Your Hand" was remixed by various DJ's and released as "Raise Your Hand (U Got To)" from different labels in 2005.

Critical reception 
People (May 12, 1986):Ike's original songs are mixed with tightly knit arrangements of R&B standards — "I Know (You Don't Want Me No More)" and "Shake a Hand." Ike's lyrics often are swaggering, especially on the title cut, but Tina sings them with palpable conviction... Tunes such as Ike’s "Bootsie Whitelaw" and Troy Seals and Don Goodman's "Mississippi Rolling Stone" are poignant reminders of Ike's and Tina's productive if sometimes tumultuous years together. They also show that as dynamic as Tina is today, nobody ever got more out of her musically than Ike."

Track listing 
All tracks written by Ike Turner, except where noted.

References 

1985 compilation albums
1986 compilation albums
Ike & Tina Turner compilation albums
Albums produced by Ike Turner